Melanie Jane Hill (born 11 January 1962) is a British actress, known for playing Hazel Redfern in Auf Wiedersehen, Pet (1985–1986), Aveline in Bread (1986–1991), Rita Dolan in Kay Mellor drama Playing the Field (1998–2002),  Maggie Budgen in the BBC One school-based drama series Waterloo Road (2012–2015), Julie Travers in BBC One drama series The Syndicate (2015) and Cathy Matthews in ITV soap opera Coronation Street (2015–2022)

Acting career 
Hill was educated at Monkwearmouth School before attending the Royal Academy of Dramatic Art in London, where she won the Vanbrugh award.

Television 
Hill replaced Gilly Coman as the character of Aveline in the last three series' of Carla Lane's BBC television sitcom Bread. She has also appeared in such programmes as The Bill playing Marie Carver (née Graham), Auf Wiedersehen, Pet playing Hazel Redfern, Hot Money playing Liz Hoodless, Juliet Bravo playing Jean Simpson, Emmerdale playing Avril Kent and Cape Wrath playing Brenda Ogilvie.

On 17 March 2009, she was featured in an episode of Holby City, a medical drama broadcast weekly on BBC1 in the United Kingdom. She appeared in subsequent episodes, following a story arc relating to the death of her on-screen husband. She also appeared in an episode of The Thick of It (series 3 episode 3).

In April 2011, she appeared in the BBC television comedy drama series Candy Cabs and in November, in the fantasy series Merlin as Mary Howden. In April that year, she appeared as Cissie Charlton, mother of footballers Jack and Bobby Charlton, in the BBC drama United, about the 1958 Munich air disaster involving Manchester United.

In 2012, she made her debut on long-running school drama Waterloo Road as Maggie. 

In August 2013, it was announced that Hill had joined the cast of the BBC Two sitcom Hebburn. The next year she joined the Craig Cash sitcom After Hours.

In February 2015, it was announced that Hill would join the cast of Coronation Street as Cathy Matthews, and she made her first appearance on 20 April 2015. She was introduced as a potential love interest for Roy Cropper (David Neilson), which Hill was nervous about, as Roy's deceased wife, Hayley (Julie Hesmondhalgh), was loved by the nation. Hill also starred in the third series of The Syndicate in June 2015.

Film 
Hill's feature film roles include Sandra in Brassed Off (1996), the witch Ditchwater Sal in the fantasy film Stardust (2007), and Sonya in White Girl (2008).

Personal life 
Born to Anthony and Sylvia (née Pratt) Hill in Brighton, Hill was raised in her mother's native city of Sunderland. She married fellow actor Sean Bean in December 1990. They have two daughters: Lorna, born October 1987, and Molly, born September 1991. They divorced in August 1997. She is a supporter of Sunderland A.F.C. She married writer and producer Jimmy Daly on 29 April 2017 at a pub in Muswell Hill, North London.

Filmography

Film

Television

References

External links 
 

1962 births
Living people
Alumni of RADA
English film actresses
English soap opera actresses
English television actresses
People from Sunderland
Actors from County Durham
Actresses from Tyne and Wear
People educated at Monkwearmouth School